The men's tandem at the 1928 Summer Olympics took place at the Olympic Stadium in Amsterdam.

This track cycling event consisted of multiple rounds. The event was a single elimination tournament, with a third-place race between the semifinal losers.

The Dutch entrants for this race were Bernhard Leene and Daan van Dijk. They beat the Austrian team in the first round, and competed against the German team in the semi-final. After two rounds, the Dutch team fell, and the race was restarted. This second time, the Dutch team won with a small margin.

In the final, the Dutch team faced the British team, John Sibbit and Ernest Chambers. The British team led the race until the final corner, when the Dutch team overtook them.

Match round
Source:

Round 1

Match 1

Match 2

Match 3

Match 4

Semifinals

Semifinal 1

Semifinal 2

Medal matches

Gold medal match

Bronze medal match

References

Track cycling at the 1928 Summer Olympics
Cycling at the Summer Olympics – Men's tandem